Leigh Stewart De-Vulgt (born 17 March 1981) is a Welsh footballer who plays for Afan Lido.

Career

Swansea City
A Welsh youth and under-21 international, De-Vulgt began his career with his hometown club Swansea City, progressing through the youth ranks before making his professional debut on 26 December 1999 as a late substitute in place of Lee Jenkins during a 1–0 victory over Leyton Orient. He went on to make 23 league appearances for the club over four years before being released from his contract in December 2002 by new head coach Brian Flynn to clear room for new signings.

Welsh Premier League
After brief spells with Llanelli and Merthyr Tydfil, De-Vulgt spent two seasons at Carmerthen Town. In 2004, he moved to fellow Welsh Premier League side Port Talbot Town and has remained at the club since, making over 250 league appearances and finishing as runner-up in the 2010 Welsh Cup Final. In 2013, De-Vulgt was awarded the Welsh Premier League Clubman of the Year award for his long service to Port Talbot.

He left Port Talbot in 2016 after 12 years with the side, joining Afan Lido as player-coach.

Personal life
De-Vulgt is the brother-in-law of former Wales international John Hartson having married his sister Vicky.

Honours

Club
Port Talbot Town
Welsh Cup Finalist: 2009–10

Individual
Welsh Premier League Clubman of the Year: 2013

References

External links

1981 births
Living people
Welsh footballers
Wales under-21 international footballers
Swansea City A.F.C. players
Llanelli Town A.F.C. players
Merthyr Tydfil F.C. players
Carmarthen Town A.F.C. players
Port Talbot Town F.C. players
Afan Lido F.C. players
English Football League players
Cymru Premier players
Wales youth international footballers
Association football defenders